Fox in a Fix is a 1951 Warner Bros. Merrie Melodies cartoon directed by Robert McKimson. The short was released on January 20, 1951.

Plot
The story opens when the fox is seen sneaking from atop a hill down to a farm. As he is walking, he narrates the story to the viewer. His first line is like: "As the last light went out, I knew my chance had come, to get at those chickens". After his first attempt and fail at stealing the chickens and being caught by the watch dog, he decides a different approach. To gain the friendship and trust of the bulldog, the fox shaves his tail and pretends to be a hard-luck terrier looking for a place to live. 

Unbeknown to the fox, the bulldog instantly sees through the fox's ploy but acts as though he is fooled. He agrees to share his home with the fox. At night, the fox sneaks into the chicken coop to steal one of the hens. The dog disguises himself as a huge chicken, which the greedy fox takes, and when the bulldog reveals himself beneath the disguise, the fox bolts and runs to a highway, where he hitches a ride on a passing truck, not noticing that the truck belongs to a fox furrier company.

References

1951 animated films
1951 short films
1951 films
Films directed by Robert McKimson
Merrie Melodies short films
Warner Bros. Cartoons animated short films
1950s Warner Bros. animated short films
Films scored by Carl Stalling
1950s English-language films
Animated films about foxes